East Richmond railway station is located on the Lilydale, Belgrave, Alamein and Glen Waverley lines in Victoria, Australia. It serves the inner eastern Melbourne suburb of Cremorne, and it opened on 24 September 1860 as Church Street. It was renamed East Richmond on 1 January 1867.

History

East Richmond station was opened by the Melbourne and Suburban Railway Company, when its service to Hawthorn began on 24 September 1860. A level crossing was formerly located at Green Street, near the Up end of the station, which was removed on 12 March 1965 and replaced with a pedestrian subway, along with the associated signal box. In the 1960s, the line through the station was quadrupled, with the track being lowered by 1.2 metres, and a new Platform 1 was built. The first of the two new tracks was commissioned on 1 August 1966, and the second on 9 January 1967, along with the new platform. In 1980, crossovers were provided at the Up end of the station.

On 4 May 2010, as part of the 2010/2011 State Budget, $83.7 million was allocated to upgrade East Richmond to a Premium Station, along with nineteen others. However, in March 2011, this was scrapped by the Baillieu Government.

Platforms and services

East Richmond station has two side platforms, and a total of four tracks operating through it. Its location at the city end of Melbourne's busiest group of railway lines means that a large number of services pass through the station, but only a limited number stop there, largely because of its proximity to Richmond, a few hundred metres away in Swan Street.

Services to and from Lilydale and Belgrave do not normally stop at East Richmond. Glen Waverley services stop here, except for Glen Waverley-bound trains in the morning peak. Most services to and from Alamein, Blackburn and Ringwood stop here.

It is serviced by Metro Trains' Lilydale, Belgrave, Alamein and Glen Waverley line services.

Platform 1:
  all stations services to Flinders Street
  all stations services to Flinders Street
  weekday all stations services to Flinders Street
  all stations services to Flinders Street

Platform 2:
  all stations services to Blackburn and Ringwood
  all stations services to Blackburn and Ringwood
  weekday all stations services to Alamein
  all stations services to Glen Waverley

Transport links

Yarra Trams operates two routes via East Richmond station:
 : Docklands (Waterfront City) – Wattle Park
 : North Richmond – Balaclava

References

External links

 Melway map at street-directory.com.au

Railway stations in Australia opened in 1860
Railway stations in Melbourne
Railway stations in the City of Yarra